Tarjan's algorithm may refer to one of several algorithms attributed to Robert Tarjan, including:

 Tarjan's strongly connected components algorithm
 Tarjan's off-line lowest common ancestors algorithm
 Tarjan's algorithm for finding bridges in an undirected graph
 Tarjan's algorithm for finding simple circuits in a directed graph

See also
List of algorithms

References

Algorithms
Mathematics-related lists